In Time is an album by jazz violinist Mat Maneri and pianist Pandelis Karayorgis, recorded in 1993 and released on Leo Lab, a sublabel of Leo Records. The album includes six original pieces and two interpretations of Thelonious Monk composition "Ugly Beauty".

Reception

In his review for AllMusic, Thom Jurek states: "As a work of restrained beauty and subtle textures and colors, it is nearly a masterpiece... This was an auspicious meeting of two young minds who had already in 1994 established their own voices on a burgeoning jazz improv scene."

The Penguin Guide to Jazz says that the album "is delicately beautiful and thoughtful, almost as a classical duo in timbre and dynamics, but dealing with a language that is far from classical."

Track listing
 "Ugly Beauty #1" (Thelonious Monk) – 4:40
 "Speaking" (Pandelis Karayorgis) – 9:31
 "Savigny Platz" (Mat Maneri) – 8:42
 "Part III of a Name" (Pandelis Karayorgis) – 6:46
 "Miranda" (Mat Maneri) – 5:48
 "In Time" (Pandelis Karayorgis) – 9:29
 "Blue Seven" (Mat Maneri) – 12:07
 "Ugly Beauty #2" (Thelonious Monk) – 5:10

Personnel
Mat Maneri - electric violin
Pandelis Karayorgis - piano

References

1994 albums
Mat Maneri albums
Pandelis Karayorgis albums
Leo Records albums